"I Can't Unlove You" is a song recorded by American country music artist Kenny Rogers. It was released in December 2005 as the first single from his album Water & Bridges. The song was written by Wade Kirby and Will Robinson. In Brazil, the song had a version titled "Eu Não Sei Dizer Que Eu Não Te Amo", performed by the duo Edson & Hudson in Portuguese and by Kenny Rogers in English.

Critical reception
Kevin John Coyne of Country Universe wrote that Rogers "sounds as good as ever on this breakup song that rises above its awkward title." The song also received a favorable review from Deborah Evans Price of Billboard, who said that "Rogers delivers this gorgeous ballad in the warm, straightforward style that has made him a household name."

Music video
The music video was directed by Peter Zavadil and premiered in December 2005.

Chart performance
The song debuted at #57 on the U.S. Billboard Hot Country Songs chart for the week of December 10, 2005. 
It would be his final Top 20 single.

References

2005 singles
Kenny Rogers songs
Capitol Records Nashville singles
Song recordings produced by Dann Huff
Music videos directed by Peter Zavadil
Country ballads
Songs written by Wade Kirby
Songs written by Will Robinson (songwriter)
2005 songs